Shambhu Dutt (9 September 1918 – 15 April 2016), born Shambu Dutt Sharma was an Indian Gandhian freedom fighter and anti-corruption activist.

Early life
Shambhu Dutt Sharma was born in Punjab Province, British India in Hoshiarpur District near Mukerian on 9 September 1918.

Gandhian freedom fighter

He was a Gandhian freedom fighter. He joined Mahatma Gandhi's Quit India movement in 1942 at the age of 24 after resigning as a civilian gazetted officer from the British Indian Army. Shambhu Dutt was a law graduate. He was imprisoned.

In 1975 he was again imprisoned protesting during the Emergency in India imposed by Prime Minister Indira Gandhi.

Fighting corruption

In 2007, when honorary general secretary of the Gandhian Satyagraha Brigade, Sharma said "corruption has become rampant. It has to be wiped out. On this issue we will start the Satyagraha". He favoured the adoption of the Corrupt Public Servants  (Forfeiture of Property) bill prepared by the Law Commission of India in 1999, which proposed to bar criminals from contesting elections.

At the age of 92 on 30 January 2011 he ended his fast unto death demanding the end of corruption in India, persuaded by several prominent people including Kiran Bedi, Swami Agnivesh and also by Prashant Bhushan and Arvind Kejriwal. However, he felt betrayed because Anna Hazare was getting media attention.

He was also the founder of Transparency International India. Sharma's team was known as Gandhian Seva Brigade.

See also

 Gandhism
 Jan Lokpal Bill
 2011 Indian anti-corruption movement
 Lokpal
 Lok Sewak Sangh
 Satyagraha
 The Lokpal and Lokayuktas Act, 2013

References

1918 births
2016 deaths
Indian nationalists
Indian revolutionaries